The Elbit Systems Hermes 900 Kochav ("Star") is an Israeli medium-size, multi-payload, medium-altitude long-endurance unmanned aerial vehicle (UAV) designed for tactical missions. It is a successor to the Hermes 450 series of drones, one of the most widely used military drones in the world.

Payload options include electro-optical/infrared sensors, synthetic-aperture radar/ground-moving target indication, communications and electronic intelligence, electronic warfare, and hyperspectral sensors.

Operational history

Israel 
The Hermes 900 was first used by Israel during Operation Protective Edge in July 2014. It had been undergoing test flights and wasn't planned for operational deployment until late 2015, but it was introduced during the operation for unique missions that it could perform better than the Hermes 450. A few days after receiving orders to deploy the aircraft, one Kochav was readied for "temporary activity." The Hermes 900's first operational mission took place on July 15, 2014, which was a link in a chain of operations that eventually led to a fighter jet attack that destroyed terrorist infrastructure. Maintenance on the aircraft during the operation was done by Elbit personnel because IAF ground teams had not yet been qualified to perform maintenance on it, and mission stations had Elbit representatives that guided the operators during combat flights. Following the end of the operation, the Hermes 900 returned to integration and flight testing to pass milestones that still needed to be met. The Hermes 900 was officially introduced into the IAF's operational lineup on 11 November 2015.

Azerbaijan 
Azerbaijani media first mentioned the procurement of the Hermes 900 in August 2017, reporting up to 15 units having been purchased. In May 2018, the Azerbaijani government confirmed the purchase, releasing photos of Azerbaijani President Ilham Aliyev inspecting one of the drones.

During the 2020 Armenian-Azerbaijani skirmishes, Armenia's Defense Ministry spokesperson Shushan Stepanyan reported that Armenian forces  had shot down an Azerbaijani Hermes 900 drone, sharing the video of the alleged shoot down on social media. The Azerbaijani side denied losing any of its drones.

Operators

 Two Hermes 900s were delivered in 2017. In May 2018, Azerbaijani president visited a military base to inspect military equipment, released photos from the visit included one Hermes 900.

 Elbit Systems has been awarded a contract to supply a Hermes 900 unmanned air system to the Brazilian air force. In December 2021, the Brazilian Air Force acquires two more remotely piloted Hermes 900 aircraft.

 The Government of Canada announced its award of a contract to Elbit Systems for the procurement of a single Hermes 900 in late 2022 for use by Transport Canada in oil spill detection, environmental surveys, and monitoring Canada's Arctic.

 In July 2011, Elbit reported the first export sale of its Hermes 900 UAV to the Chilean Air Force. The Chilean choice followed evaluation of two classes of UAVs. At the high end were the Elbit Hermes 900 and IAI Heron. At the lower (tactical) level were Elbit Hermes 450, and Aerostar from Aeronautics Defense Systems. Three Hermes 900 UAVs are operated by the Chilean Air Force. On October 2013, the Chilean Navy began evaluating the Hermes 900 for procurement for maritime patrol tasks.

 In August 2012, Elbit won a multi-million-dollar contract to supply a mixed fleet of Hermes 900 and Hermes 450 unmanned air systems to Colombia. On July 2013, the Colombian Air Force confirmed they have one Hermes 900 on order, to be accepted in the coming months.

 In September 2018, the Portuguese company Centro de Engenharia e Desenvolvimento was contracted to the European Maritime Safety Agency to provide long-range, long-endurance maritime surveillance services using the Hermes 900.

 
 Iceland uses Hermes 900 UAV to monitor its exclusive economic zone.

 
The Israeli air force has equipped its Elbit Systems Hermes 900 unmanned air vehicles with undisclosed specialist payloads, and formally named the type "Kochav" (Star). The UAV made its first operational flight during "Protective Edge" operation in Gaza on July 2014.

 In January 2012, Elbit announced it has been awarded a $50 million contract to supply two Hermes 900 systems to an undisclosed customer "in the Americas", later revealed to be the Mexican Federal Police.

 In August 2020, Philippine Air Force received full delivery of three Hermes 900 and one Hermes 450 unmanned aerial systems (UAS) as part of a contract worth approximately $175 million. Each system consists of three unmanned aerial vehicles (UAVs), a ground control system and support equipment. Elbit Systems also included a spare used Hermes 450 UAV as part of the deal, for a total of 9 Hermes 900 UAVs and 4 Hermes 450 UAVs.

 In June 2014, Switzerland's procurement agency selected the Hermes 900 to meet the nation's requirement. The design had been in competition with IAI Heron to replace the RUAG Ranger UAV (ADS 95) of the Swiss Air Force. Planned was to replace the 15 Ruag Rangers with Six Hermes 900 (ADS 15) by 2019. To fulfill the Swiss requirements, extensive changes at the drone where necessary. Among others it was necessary to change wing and wingspan to carry a heavier engine with more power. In August 2020, a drone crashed during a test flight in Israel, the cause was a structural design flaw which has been fixed. The new drones should now begin their operation between 2022 and 2023, the "Sense-and-Avoid" - System not before 2024. The Swiss model of the drone is called Hermes 900 StarLiner, also Hermes 900 HFE (Heavy Fuel Engine) in the Swiss program.

Specifications

References

External links 

Hermes 900 Brochure
Hermes 900, Elbit Systems
 Hermes 900 MALE Tactical UAV System, Defense Update
Hermes 900, Israeli-weapons.com

Elbit unmanned aerial vehicles
2010s Israeli military reconnaissance aircraft
V-tail aircraft